Monica Geingos (née Kalondo; born November 15, 1976) is a Namibian entrepreneur, lawyer and First Lady of Namibia since 2015. She has been a board member and director within many of the country's large companies. She had also chaired the Presidential Economic Advisory Council.

Education and Career 
Monica Geingos is a qualified lawyer with over 20 years of experience in the financial sector, with senior roles in capital markets, corporate finance, and private equity. She was awarded National Honours by Former President Pohamba, for her “outstanding contribution to the socio-economic development of Namibia.” She was inducted into the Namibian Business Hall of Fame and received numerous awards, such as the “Namibian Business Personality of the Year’ and “Most Innovative Entrepreneur”. During her time in the private sector, Monica was regularly rated by local and continental media publications as one of the most influential Namibians and recognised by international media as one of “Africa’s Top 100 Economic Leaders”.

Before assuming the First Lady role in 2015, she was a co-shareholder and Managing Director of Namibia’s largest private equity fund for over a decade. During this time, she served on the Boards of large public and private sector companies as either Chairperson or Deputy Chairperson.

Due to her extensive corporate experience, she was a long-standing member of high-level policy advisory Boards - such as the President’s Economic Advisory Council, the governing Party’s Think Tank, and the National Council of the Namibia Chamber of Commerce and Industry - with the mandate to advise on national policy formulation and implementation.

She also made time to serve on Boards such as the Association of Unlisted Investment Managers (Chairperson), the Steering Committee for the Namibian Financial Sector Charter (Secretary), the Listings Advisory Board of the Namibian Stock Exchange, and the Public Office Bearers Commission (Vice-Chairperson).

Personal life 
Geingos married the then-President-elect of Namibia, Hage Geingob,  on February 14, 2015, shortly before he was sworn into office. She has served as First Lady since March 2015.

Interests 
As First Lady, Geingos has combined her high-level corporate expertise with President Geingob’s war on poverty and inequality. Through the One Economy Foundation, the First Lady has initiated numerous programs that focus on sustainably lifting vulnerable populations out of poverty traps. In this regard, a flagship project, the #BeFreeMovement, occupies most of her time. This youth-driven program facilitates a non-judgmental platform for adolescents and young adults to freely discuss their challenges while assisting them with access to information and appropriate services. Mrs Geingos is currently overseeing the institutionalisation of #BeFree key learnings into Project #BeFree by constructing an inclusive one-stop youth Centre of excellence. Project Be Free intends to provide a continuum of holistic services, including life skills programs, mental health support, the full spectrum of adolescent-friendly sexual and reproductive health services (including comprehensive sexuality education), skills and leadership development, entrepreneurship development and adolescent-friendly edutainment. In addition, project #BeFree has entered several smart partnerships in the public, private, and non-profit space to ensure that the Project closes the mental health and SRH service delivery gaps experienced by young people.

Her office also focuses on:
the Break Free Anti Violence campaign (fights against Gender-Based Violence); 
One Nation Fund (provides micro-entrepreneurs with responsible and sustainable access to collateral and interest-free loans, entrepreneurial training, and mentorship);
Talented Individual Programme (academic fellowship which provides talented children from low-income families access to quality education while providing them with the full spectrum of clinical and psychosocial support).

Regarding her international obligations, Mrs Geingos is the Chairperson of the Africa REACH Leadership Council, an initiative to create a new action agenda around ending AIDS in children and youth in Africa. She further serves as a director of the following entities; the Oxford African Studies Centre International Advisory Board; the Monrovia-based Ellen Johnson Sirleaf Presidential Center for Women and Development; the Hamburg-based Ohhh! Foundation Advisory Board and is a Co-Patron of the Nairobi-based PLO Lumumba Foundation Africa Mentorship Programme. She is also a Leadership Council member of Concordia, a New-York based non-profit which builds global partnerships for social impact. Concordia draws its leadership from former government leaders, policy experts, and industry leaders. Mrs Geingos is also the President of the Organisation of African First Ladies for Development (OAFLAD). She is a member of the WomenLift Global Advisory Board, a non-profit organization aimed at working with different partners around the world to accelerate the advancement of talented women into senior leadership. She is a newly appointed member of the Board of Trustees of the Virchow Foundation for Global Health, which aims to promote Global and Public Health.

Since becoming First Lady, Mrs Geingos has added to the numerous merit awards she obtained during her professional career. She is the UNAIDS Special Advocate for Young Women and Adolescent Girls and a recipient of the “Change the World Award” from the Professional Speakers Association. She was honoured with the international “World Without Aids” Award for her advocacy work in the fight against AIDS. She was awarded the annual Concordia Leadership Award for her global leadership and “unique and powerful efforts to lead the way for health and socio-economic empowerment.” Various international organisations and publications have ranked Mrs Geingos as one of the “100 Most Reputable Africans” and one of the “100 Most Influential African Women”. She is a two time recipient of the Dususu awards for her work on adolescent sexual and reproductive health and rights. Mrs. Geingos is a recognised leader whose forthright speaking manner has made her a sought-after speaker, featured in prominent global publications and international news networks.

References

External links
“#BreakFree Campaign.” 1 Economy Foundation, https://www.oneeconomyfoundation.com/breakfree-from-violence.

“100Women: Avance Media: 2020 Honourees.” 100Women Avance Media, https://100women.avancemedia.org/2020-honourees/.

Admin-Ejspc. “Ellen Johnson Sirleaf Presidential Center for Women and Development.” EJS Center, 24 Jan. 2023, https://www.ejscenter.org/.

“African Studies Centre's International Advisory Board Inauguration.” African Studies Centre, 12 Oct. 2018, https://www.africanstudies.ox.ac.uk/article/african-studies-centres-international-advisory-board-inauguration.

AfricaNews. “'100 Most Reputable Africans' in 2023 Announced.” Africanews, Africanews, 3 Jan. 2023, https://www.africanews.com/2023/01/03/100-most-reputable-africans-in-2023-announced/.

“Global Advisory Board.” WomenLift Health, 19 Jan. 2023, https://www.womenlifthealth.org/global-advisory-board/.

“Homepage.” UNAIDS, 1 Feb. 2023, https://www.unaids.org/en. 
“Leadership Council • Africa Reach.” Africa Reach, 16 Nov. 2022, https://www.africareach.org/leadership-council/.

NBHF, 
 https://www.namibianbusinesshalloffame.com/hall-of-fame. 
“OAFLAD.” Oaflad Site Wide Activity RSS, https://oaflad.org/en/#:~:text=In%202002%2C%20First%20Ladies%20of,affected%20by%20HIV%20and%20AIDS.

“Ohhh! Foundation.” Ohhh! Foundation, https://www.ohhh.org/.

“One Economy Foundation.” 1 Economy Foundation, https://www.oneeconomyfoundation.com/. 
“Partnerships for Social Impact.” Concordia, 30 Jan. 2023, https://www.concordia.net/.

The PLO Lumumba Foundation, https://plofoundation.org/programmes/. 
“President of Namibia.” Wikipedia, Wikimedia Foundation, 4 Sept. 2022, https://en.wikipedia.org/wiki/President_of_Namibia.

“Project #BEFREE.” 1 Economy Foundation, https://www.oneeconomyfoundation.com/befree. 
“Virchow Foundation - Virchow Foundation for Global Health: Virchow Prize for Global Health.” Virchow Foundation for Global Health | Virchow Prize for Global Health, 30 Jan. 2023, https://virchowprize.org/foundation/.

1976 births
Living people
First ladies of Namibia
University of Namibia alumni
20th-century Namibian lawyers
21st-century Namibian lawyers
Namibian business executives
Namibian women in business